Azziz may refer to:

Azziz, a commune in Algeria
Ricardo Azziz, chief executive officer of the American Society for Reproductive Medicine (ASRM)
Azziz Irmal, Algerian footballer

See also
Aziz